Parker Edward Dunshee (born February 12, 1995) is an American professional baseball pitcher in the Oakland Athletics organization.

Amateur career
Dunshee attended Zionsville Community High School in Zionsville, Indiana, where he played baseball, basketball, and football. Undrafted out of high school in the 2013 Major League Baseball (MLB) draft, he enrolled at Wake Forest University where he played college baseball for the Wake Forest Demon Deacons.

In 2014, as a freshman at Wake Forest, he appeared in 27 games in relief, going 4–1 with a 2.17 ERA. As a sophomore in 2015, he went 5–3 with a 2.89 ERA in  innings which were split between starting, closing, and long relief. After the 2015 season, he played collegiate summer baseball with the Chatham Anglers of the Cape Cod Baseball League, and was named a league all-star. In 2016, Dunshee's junior year, he pitched to a 10–5 record with a 3.20 ERA in 16 games (15 starts). After his junior year, he was drafted in the 14th round of the 2016 Major League Baseball draft by the Chicago Cubs. However, he did not sign and chose to return to Wake Forest for his senior year. During his senior year, he started 17 games and went 9–1 with a 3.91 ERA, helping lead Wake Forest to their first super regional appearance since 1999. After his senior year, Dunshee was drafted by the Oakland Athletics in the seventh round of the 2017 Major League Baseball draft.

Professional career
Dunshee signed with Oakland and made his professional debut with the Rookie-level Arizona League Athletics where he pitched in one game before being promoted to the Vermont Lake Monsters of the Class A Short Season New York-Penn League, where he was named an All-Star. In  innings pitched for Vermont, he did not allow a run. In 2018, he began with the Stockton Ports of the Class A-Advanced California League and was named an All-Star before being promoted to the Midland RockHounds of the Class AA Texas League in June. In 24 games (22 starts) between the two clubs, he went 13–6 with a 2.33 ERA and a 1.00 WHIP. To begin the 2019 season, he returned to Midland before he was promoted to the Las Vegas Aviators of the Class AAA Pacific Coast League in May. Over 26 games (25 starts) between the two clubs, Dunshee pitched to a 6–7 record with a 4.36 ERA, striking out 124 over 130 innings. After the season, he was selected for the United States national baseball team in the 2019 WBSC Premier 12. Over two starts, he compiled a 1.59 ERA covering  innings.

Dunshee did not play a minor league game in 2020 due to the cancellation of the minor league season caused by the COVID-19 pandemic. To begin the 2021 season, he returned to the Aviators, now members the Triple-A West. After five starts, he was placed on the injured list with a collarbone injury. He was activated in early September. Over ten games (nine starts) with the Aviators for the 2021 season, Dunshee went 1-5 with a 6.65 ERA and 38 strikeouts over  innings. 

Dunshee returned to Las Vegas for the 2022 season. Over 31 games (twenty starts), he went 5-11 with a 9.22 ERA and 92 strikeouts in  innings and led the minors in home runs allowed with 38.

References

External links

1995 births
Living people
Arizona League Athletics players
Baseball pitchers
Baseball players from Indiana
Chatham Anglers players
Las Vegas Aviators players
Midland RockHounds players
People from Zionsville, Indiana
Stockton Ports players
United States national baseball team players
Vermont Lake Monsters players
Wake Forest Demon Deacons baseball players
2019 WBSC Premier12 players
Wisconsin Woodchucks players